Emmet Lanigan (6 September 1909 – 27 May 1989) was an Australian cricketer. He played one first-class cricket match for Victoria in 1931.

See also
 List of Victoria first-class cricketers

References

External links
 

1909 births
1989 deaths
Australian cricketers
Victoria cricketers
People from Maffra
Cricketers from Victoria (Australia)